Zhang Wenyue (born October 1944) was the Chinese Communist Party Liaoning provincial committee Secretary, succeeding Li Keqiang from October 2007. In 2009 he retired and was succeeded by Wang Min.

Biography
A native of Pucheng, Fujian province and a graduate of the Beijing Institute of Geology, Zhang joined the Chinese Communist Party in June 1965. During the Cultural Revolution Zhang was placed in an army work troupe, subsequently being sent to Sichuan in 1969. Since then his career had been largely concentrated in the geological field until 1995, when he was transferred to work in Xinjiang as the autonomous region's deputy party secretary.

From 1999 to 2001 he served as the commander-in-chief of the Xinjiang Production and Construction Corps, before moving onto Liaoning to succeed Bo Xilai to become the province's governor in 2004.

References 

1944 births
Living people
China University of Geosciences alumni
Chinese Communist Party politicians from Fujian
Politicians from Nanping
People's Republic of China politicians from Fujian
Governors of Liaoning